Natfact 7 is a novel by John Tully published in 1984.

Plot summary
Natfact 7 is a novel in which in 21st-Century Britain, dissent occurs at Natfact 7 between the Nats forced to work there, and the Qualified Citizens who rule.

Reception
Dave Langford reviewed NatFact 7 for White Dwarf #87, and stated that "Following the old arguments about the justifiability of violence and ultimate worth of revolution, all ends in a state of realistic confusion with just a tiny gain for the forces of good... and Tully instructs you to think of your own moral. Punchy and hard-hitting for 'young adult' SF, but a little too slick for its own good."

Reviews
Review by Brian Stableford (1985) in Fantasy Review, March 1985

References

1984 British novels